Jost Liebmann (died 1701) was a court Jew and court jeweller of Elector Frederick III of Brandenburg (King Frederick I of Prussia), and one of the leaders of the Jewish community of Berlin.

Early life 
Originally from Göttingen, Liebmann arrived in Berlin following his marriage to Esther, the widow of court Jew Israel Aaron, whose position he inherited.

His wealth and standing at the court enabled him to exercise great influence in the early period of the Jewish congregation. He acquired the privilege of having his own synagogue, to which he appointed as rabbi his nephew and son-in-law, Aaron ben Benjamin Wolf. Due to his differences with Marcus Magnus, court Jew of the crown prince, the congregation was split into two factions, and after his death the quarrel was continued by his widow and his sons Israel and Liebmann Jost. Among his numerous descendants are the brothers Giacomo Meyerbeer, and Michael and Wilhelm Beer.

References

Court Jews
17th-century births
1701 deaths
Year of birth unknown